Tridemorph is a fungicide used to control Erysiphe graminis. It was developed by BASF in the 1960s who use the trade name Calixin. The World Health Organization has categorized it as a Class II "moderately hazardous" pesticide because it is believed harmful if swallowed and can cause irritation to skin and eyes.

One theory for the cause of the Hollinwell incident is that it might have been caused by inhalation of tridemorph.

References

External links

Fungicides
Morpholines